The Shimane Maru class was a pair of auxiliary escort carriers built for the Imperial Japanese Navy (IJN) during World War II.

Four additional conversions were reportedly considered but not carried out. Although both ships were launched, only one was completed, and neither entered active service before being destroyed.

Design and description
The concept of the class was similar to British merchant aircraft carrier. The class consisted of two oil tankers of  that were modified by the Navy to provide minimal anti-submarine air cover for convoys going from Southeast Asia to the Japanese homeland. The conversion consisted of fitting a full-length flight deck, a small hangar, and a single elevator. An island and catapults were not installed. The only other change was the rerouting of the boiler uptakes to the aft starboard side where they discharged in a typical downward-facing funnel.

They displaced  at standard load.

It drove one propeller shaft using steam provided by two boilers.

The hangar, built on top of the well deck, was served by a single elevator from the flight deck. It had a capacity of a dozen aircraft.

Ships

 She was completed on 28 February 1945, but was sunk 24 July 1945 by British aircraft at Shido Bay, Kagawa Prefecture at position . Her hulk was also mined, then scrapped at Naniwa in 1948.
 Her construction was 70% completed when she drifted onto a mine on 25 August 1945 and sank. Her hulk was scrapped at Kobe in 1948.
  - Laid down by Kawasaki on 18 December 1944, construction stopped in February 1945. Constructions were restarted and sold to Iino Lines K.K. on 19 October 1949, and renamed . Scrapped at Yokosuka in May 1964.
  - Cancelled in 1944.

Photo

Notes

Bibliography
 
 
 
 
 
 The Maru Special, Japanese Naval Vessels No. 38, Japanese aircraft carriers II, Ushio Shobō (Japan)

External links

Escort aircraft carrier classes
 
 
Ships built by Kawasaki Heavy Industries